Cherokee is an unincorporated community in Logan County, in the U.S. state of Ohio.

History
Cherokee was platted in 1832, and named after nearby Cherokee Mans Run. A post office was established at Cherokee in 1832, and remained in operation until 1849.

References

Unincorporated communities in Logan County, Ohio
1832 establishments in Ohio
Populated places established in 1832
Unincorporated communities in Ohio